Alan Sproates (30 June 1944 – 5 February 2015) was an English professional footballer who played as a midfielder. He made nearly 350 appearances in the Football League, including more than 300 for Darlington, and also played in Australia and the United States.

Career
Sproates was born in 1944 in Hetton-le-Hole, which was then in County Durham. He began his football career with Sunderland, where he turned professional in 1961, but made no first-team appearances before he joined Swindon Town in 1963. After two seasons in which he played only five first-team games, Sproates moved to Darlington in part-exchange for Jimmy Lawton. He remained at the club until 1974, making 315 league appearances and helping the club reach runners-up spot in the Fourth Division and promotion to the Third Division in the 1965–66 season. He spent the summer of 1973 playing in the North American Soccer League for Miami Toros.

After a year with Scunthorpe United, Sproates was signed by Ukrainian Sports Club Lion in Adelaide playing in the South Australian First Division. He was so impressive that he was voted the Best and Fairest player in the league winning the John Martin Medal. Soon after he moved to the United States, where he coached football and played in the American Soccer League for Los Angeles Skyhawks and for the San Francisco Fog during the 1980–81 Major Indoor Soccer League season.

Sproates and his wife, Bonnie, lived in San Rafael and San Anselmo, in Marin County, California. He died in California in 2015 at the age of 70.

Honours
Darlington
 Fourth Division runners-up: 1965–66

References

1944 births
2015 deaths
People from Hetton-le-Hole
Footballers from Tyne and Wear
People from San Anselmo, California
English footballers
Association football midfielders
Sunderland A.F.C. players
Swindon Town F.C. players
Darlington F.C. players
Miami Toros players
Scunthorpe United F.C. players
Los Angeles Skyhawks players
San Francisco Fog (MISL) players
English Football League players
North American Soccer League (1968–1984) players
American Soccer League (1933–1983) players
Major Indoor Soccer League (1978–1992) players
English expatriate footballers
English expatriate sportspeople in the United States
Expatriate soccer players in the United States
English expatriate sportspeople in Australia
Expatriate soccer players in Australia